The Manitoba Lotteries Men's Curling Classic was an annual bonspiel, or curling tournament, that took place at the Brandon Curling Club in Brandon, Manitoba. The tournament was held in a triple-knockout format. The tournament, started in 1998 as part of the World Curling Tour and was held until 2011. Curlers from Manitoba dominated the event.
The event was cancelled in 2012.

Past champions
''Only skip's name is displayed.

External links
Brandon Curling Club Home

References

Former World Curling Tour events
Curling competitions in Brandon, Manitoba
1998 establishments in Manitoba
2011 disestablishments in Manitoba
Recurring sporting events established in 1998
Recurring sporting events disestablished in 2011